Zhou Lei is a former world level badminton player from China who later coached in the United States.

Career
Primarily a doubles specialist, Zhou's biggest badminton achievement was winning women's doubles at the 1993 IBF World Championships in Birmingham, England with compatriot Nong Qunhua. Zhou also shared women's doubles titles at the French (1989), Swedish (1990), Thailand (1992), and Hong Kong (1992) Opens. In 1989 she was a runner-up at the prestigious All-England Championships and a bronze medalist at the IBF World Championships with Sun Xiaoqing. Zhou was a women's singles runner-up to Tang Jiuhong at the Denmark Open in 1990. She was a member of the world champion Chinese Uber Cup (women's international) teams of 1990 and 1992. After retiring, she first went to coach in Peru. Now, she currently coaches in the US at Z Badminton Training Center in Union City, where she is also the founder and owner of the club.

External links
 Profile

Living people
Chinese female badminton players
1970 births
Badminton players from Liaoning
Asian Games medalists in badminton
Badminton players at the 1990 Asian Games
Asian Games gold medalists for China
Medalists at the 1990 Asian Games